Tøyenbadet is an indoor swimming facility in Oslo, Norway.
It is the biggest swimming pool facility in the country.
 Situated in Helgesens Gate 90, it was designed by architect Gert Walter Thuesen. It was built in 1976 and contains indoor and outdoor swimming pools. It was closed for refurbishment in spring 2007 and re-opened in autumn 2008; six months later than planned. Within months of this refurbishment, the facility was experiencing water leakage problems.

Due to persistent maintenance and structural problems, the facility closed permanently in January 2020, to be entirely demolished and rebuilt. Re-opening is expected in 2023.

References

External links
 Official website 

Buildings and structures in Oslo
1976 establishments in Norway
Swimming venues in Norway